Nomophila indistinctalis is a moth in the family Crambidae. It was described by Francis Walker in 1863. It is found in Brazil.

References

Moths described in 1863
Spilomelinae